Jhoneil M. Centeno (born July 1, 1969, in Metro Manila) is a Filipino/American artist best known for his fantasy cover paintings of several d20 books. 
Born in San Andres Bukid, Manila, Philippines, Jhoneil M. Centeno's family later moved to Los Angeles, CA
His art has also been featured in books such as Spectrum 10: The Best in Contemporary Fantastic Art, D'artiste: Digital Painting, and Aphrodisia II: Art of the Female Form. He was assistant art director: Dreamers Guild in the computer game I Have No Mouth, and I Must Scream (computer game). Besides being a painter, Jhoneil is also noted for his photography and making bows for archery.

He received  a BFA degree in painting from the Art Center College of Design, Pasadena, California in 1993.

References
Moby Games: Jhoneil Centeno
Lucid Skin: Jhoneil Centeno

Review of Heart of the Machine. Notes that cover art is by Jhoneil Centeno.

External links 
Beauties and Beasties: The Art of Jhoneil  Official website

1969 births
Living people
American artists
Filipino artists
People from San Andres, Manila